Barney's Good Day, Good Night is a Barney & Friends home video. It features an array of traditional children's songs and school songs. It was released on VHS on November 4, 1997.

Plot
Barney and his friends are playing outside on a sunny day. Kristen, Stephen, Robert, and Ashley sing "Mr. Sun". Robert tells Barney that he has always wanted to stay up all night long just too see what happens at nighttime. The kids are in for some nighttime fun during the day with Barney's invention: the Night-Timer. When the lights go down, they all imagine that it's nighttime and get ready for bed by taking a bath, putting on their pajamas and brushing their teeth. Barney teaches the kids some unusual sights and sounds associated with nighttime. After singing some of their favorite nighttime songs, the stars begin to fade and before they know it, the sun is shining once again.

Cast
 Barney (voice) – Bob West
 Barney (costume) – David Joyner
 Ashley – Monet Chandler
 Kristen – Sara Hickman
 Robert – Angel Velasco
 Stephen – Chase Gallatin
 Jane - Briana Shipley

Critical reception
On The New York Times Guide to the Best Children's Videos the video was praised for its production and songs.

Songs
 "Barney Theme Song"  (tune: "Yankee Doodle")
 "4 Li'l Butterflies"
 "Mister Sun"
 "The Barney Bag"
 "What Makes a Flower So Pretty?"
 "Growing"
 "Getting Ready for Bed"
 "Just One More Thing"
 "Brahms' Lullaby"
 "Listen to the Night Time"
 "Are You Sleeping?" (English version of "Frere Jacques")
 "Aiken Drum"
 "Twinkle, Twinkle, Little Star" (English version of "Ah! vous dirai-je, Maman")
 "Mister Sun" (Reprise)
 "I Love You" (tune: "This Old Man")

References 

Barney & Friends
1997 direct-to-video films
American direct-to-video films
Mattel Creations films
1990s English-language films
Films directed by Fred Holmes
Films about dinosaurs
Night in culture
Films about children